Foued Kadir (born 5 December 1983) is a professional footballer who plays as an attacking midfielder for  club Martigues. Born in France, he is a former Algeria international.

Kadir was a member of the Algeria national team at the 2010 Africa Cup of Nations and the 2010 FIFA World Cup. He scored two goals in twenty-five games for Algeria.

Club career
Born in Martigues, Kadir began his career in the youth ranks of his hometown club, Martigues. At the age of 18, after numerous problems during his time with the club, he contemplated quitting football to become a police officer. After leaving the club, he played briefly for two amateur sides, AS Gignac and Stade Beaucairois, before joining Troyes' reserve team. After a season and a half with Troyes, he joined Championnat National side Cannes where he would spend the next three seasons.

In June 2007, Kadir went on trial with Ligue 2 side Amiens. In July 2009, he started training with Valenciennes of Ligue 1 and two weeks later signed a two-year contract with the club.

On 2 January 2013, Kadir moved to Marseille for a transfer fee €500,000, signing a three-and-a-half-year contract with the club. He was subsequently loaned to Rennes and Real Betis, signing an obligatory permanent contract with the latter after its promotion to La Liga.

On 31 August 2016, free agent Kadir signed for Getafe. The following 5 January, he moved to fellow league team Alcorcón.

International career
Kadir was called up by Algeria at the Under-23 level for a training camp in France. He has been named in the preliminary squad for Algeria's 2010 World Cup campaign. On 28 May 2010, Kadir made his debut for the Algerian national team in a friendly against the Republic of Ireland.

International goals

Honours 
Martigues

 Championnat National 2: 2021–22

References

External links

 
 

1983 births
Living people
People from Martigues
French sportspeople of Algerian descent
Algerian footballers
Association football midfielders
Ligue 1 players
Ligue 2 players
FC Martigues players
Amiens SC players
AS Cannes players
Valenciennes FC players
Olympique de Marseille players
Stade Rennais F.C. players
La Liga players
Segunda División players
Real Betis players
Getafe CF footballers
AD Alcorcón footballers
2010 FIFA World Cup players
Championnat National 2 players
2013 Africa Cup of Nations players
2015 Africa Cup of Nations players
Algeria international footballers
Algerian expatriate footballers
Algerian expatriate sportspeople in Spain
Expatriate footballers in Spain
Sportspeople from Bouches-du-Rhône
Footballers from Provence-Alpes-Côte d'Azur